Kambuja may refer to:
 Cambodia, a nation in Southeast Asia.
 Khmer Empire, a predecessor of modern Cambodia in power from 802 CE to 1431 CE.
 Kambojas, a kingdom in northwestern India in power from 700 BCE to 200 BCE.